Artocarpus thailandicus (Thai name: mahat) is a species of flowering plant in the family Moraceae. It is found in northern and central Thailand. Phylogenetically, it clusters with Artocarpus lacucha.

References

Flora of Thailand
thailandicus